The Chattanooga Police Department (CPD) is the primary law enforcement organization serving Chattanooga, Tennessee, in the United States. The department is headed by a chief of police, with one deputy chief and three assistant chiefs commanding the major bureaus of the department: the Uniformed Services Bureau, the Investigative Services Bureau, and the Administration and Support Services Bureau.

History and racial relations
The police department dates from 1852 and has evolved over the decades. The CPD made Chattanooga one of the first major Southern cities to have black police officers starting in 1883. However, the police officers were subsequently removed from the force and reintroduced on a permanent basis on August 11, 1948. The seven officers, including Officers Thaddeus Arnold, Singer Askins, W.B. Baulridge, C.E. Black, Morris Glenn, Arthur Heard, and Thomas Patterson, were initially restricted to walking beats in black neighborhoods. In 1960, black police officers were authorized to patrol all neighborhoods and arrest white citizens. Therefore, the Chattanooga Police Department integrated decades earlier than most other Southern police departments.

In the 169 year history of the Chattanooga Police, 24 officers and 1 K9 have died serving the citizens of Chattanooga.

Uniformed Services
The Uniformed Services Bureau is commanded by an Assistant Chief, and includes the Patrol Division and Special Operations Division, both under the command of a Captain, with Lieutenants and Sergeants acting and unit and shift commanders.

Investigative Services
The Investigative Services Bureau is commanded by an Assistant Chief, and includes the Property Crimes and Major Crimes units, the Criminal Investigations Division, the Special Investigations unit, and the Intelligence/Computer Crimes unit.

Administration & Support Services
The Administration & Support Services Bureau is commanded by an assistant chief, and includes a number of support and civilian units, including the technology director, training and recruiting division, operational support division, technical services division, budget/finance director, and the fleet, facilities, and security director.

Rank structure

See also

 List of law enforcement agencies in Tennessee

References 

Municipal police departments of Tennessee
Hamilton County, Tennessee